Maria Elisabeth Pembaur (also Pembaur-Elterich, née Elterich (15 April 1869 – 30 January 1937) was a German classical pianist.

Born in Grimma, Elterich studied the piano at the University of Music and Theatre Leipzig with Alfred Reisenauer, singing with Marie Hedmondt and music theory with Stephan Krehl. She lived as a pianist in Munich and toured the Netherlands, Switzerland, Denmark, Italy and Spain. In 1906, she married the pianist and composer Josef Pembaur. The two of them also performed together on two pianos.

Elterich died in Munich at the age of 67.

References

External links 
 

German classical pianists
Women classical pianists
1869 births
1937 deaths
People from Grimma